Jeffrey Lynn Yurak (born February 26, 1954) is an American former professional baseball player. He played five games in Major League Baseball (MLB) for the Milwaukee Brewers in 1978.

Career
Yurak was drafted out of Citrus Junior College in the 24th round in 1974 by the San Francisco Giants, and was drafted from their system by the Brewers following the 1976 season. In 1978, he had his one taste of major league action, appearing in five games as a pinch hitter, playing a few innings in left field in one game.

Sources

1954 births
Living people
American expatriate baseball players in Canada
Baseball players from Pasadena, California
Cedar Rapids Giants players
Great Falls Giants players
Holyoke Millers players
Major League Baseball outfielders
Milwaukee Brewers players
Vancouver Canadians players